Don't Call It Love is a 1923 American silent romantic comedy film directed by William C. deMille and written by Clara Beranger and Julian Street based upon the play Rita Coventry by Hubert Osborne. The film stars Agnes Ayres, Jack Holt, Nita Naldi, Theodore Kosloff, Rod La Rocque, and Robert Edeson. The film was released on December 24, 1923, by Paramount Pictures.

Plot
As described in a film magazine review, vampish opera diva Rita Coventry is attracted to wealthy New Yorker Richard Parrish and determines to add him to her long list of admirers, much to the annoyance of her conductor Luigi Busini, who is jealous of the many loves of his star. Richard is easily led on, too easily, in fact. While the two are at Atlantic City, Rita promptly forgets his presence when Patrick Delaney, a young piano tuner, plays one of his compositions to her. She rushes back to New York City to arrange a hearing for him. Meanwhile Alice Meldrum, an unassuming young woman who really loves Richard, hears of his infatuation. Her friend Clara Proctor advises her to play Richard instead of allowing him to take her as a matter of course. However, when Richard returns, Alice cannot deny him her love.

Cast

References

External links

Stills at silentfilmstillarchive.com
Still of Agnes Ayres at silenthollywood.com

1923 films
1920s English-language films
Silent American comedy films
1923 comedy films
Paramount Pictures films
Films directed by William C. deMille
American black-and-white films
American silent feature films
American films based on plays
1920s American films